Grandpa is Dead (Filipino:Ded na si Lolo) is a Philippine satirical comedy-drama film directed and written by Soxy Topacio.

It was selected as the Philippine submission for the Best Foreign Language Film at the 82nd Academy Awards over Lola by Brilliante Mendoza. It was not accepted as a nominee.

Synopsis
Bobet (BJ Forbes) and his family are mourning over the death of his grandfather. Throughout the six-day wake unresolved issues and family secrets resurfaces challenging the resolve of Bobet's family.

Cast
BJ Forbes as Bobet
Manilyn Reynes as Charing
Gina Alajar as Mameng
Elizabeth Oropesa as Dolores
Dick Israel as Isidro
Roderick Paulate as Joonee
Perla Bautista
Noel Cabangon
Perry Escaño
Nor Domingo
Froilan Sales
Mosang as Kapitana
Dave Cervantes
Abno Bayagbag
John Joel Spongklong

Source:New York Times

Production
The plot of the film was added with humor by director Soxie Topacio by exploring on numerous Filipino superstitious beliefs regarding the dead which involves several prohibitions such as against wearing red, sweeping the floor, taking a bath, and allowing your tears to fall on the coffin.

References

2009 films
Philippine comedy-drama films
Philippine black comedy films
Philippine satirical films
Films about death